Allocasuarina glareicola is a species of the genus Allocasuarina native to Australia.

It is found in areas of open forest in a small area on the central coast of New South Wales growing in lateritic soils.

References

glareicola
Fagales of Australia
Flora of New South Wales